The Nizhnekamsk constituency (No. 28) is a Russian legislative constituency in Tatarstan. In 1993-2007 the constituency was centered in Nizhnekamsk and stretched west to the suburbs of Kazan. However, in 2016 the constituency was redrawn significantly: it retained Nizhnekamsk, Chistopol and Zainsk but now the constituency stretches to Southern Tatarstan, which it took from Almetyevsk constituency; the western part of the former Nizhnekamsk constituency was partitioned between the Privolzhsky, Moskovsky and newly-created Central constituencies.

Members elected

Election results

1994

|-
! colspan=2 style="background-color:#E9E9E9;text-align:left;vertical-align:top;" |Candidate
! style="background-color:#E9E9E9;text-align:left;vertical-align:top;" |Party
! style="background-color:#E9E9E9;text-align:right;" |Votes
! style="background-color:#E9E9E9;text-align:right;" |%
|-
|style="background-color:"|
|align=left|Gabdulvakhit Bagautdinov
|align=left|Independent
|-
|69.1%
|-
| colspan="5" style="background-color:#E9E9E9;"|
|- style="font-weight:bold"
| colspan="4" |Source:
|
|}

1995

|-
! colspan=2 style="background-color:#E9E9E9;text-align:left;vertical-align:top;" |Candidate
! style="background-color:#E9E9E9;text-align:left;vertical-align:top;" |Party
! style="background-color:#E9E9E9;text-align:right;" |Votes
! style="background-color:#E9E9E9;text-align:right;" |%
|-
|style="background-color:#23238E"|
|align=left|Gabdulvakhit Bagautdinov (incumbent)
|align=left|Our Home – Russia
|
|38.44%
|-
|style="background-color:#D50000"|
|align=left|Robert Sadykov
|align=left|Communists and Working Russia - for the Soviet Union
|
|18.56%
|-
|style="background-color:#F5821F"|
|align=left|Darvin Akhmetov
|align=left|Bloc of Independents
|
|9.23%
|-
|style="background-color:"|
|align=left|Aleksandr Karasev
|align=left|Yabloko
|
|9.03%
|-
|style="background-color:#1A1A1A"|
|align=left|Nail Makhiyanov
|align=left|Stanislav Govorukhin Bloc
|
|7.96%
|-
|style="background-color:"|
|align=left|Mikhail Atlasov
|align=left|Liberal Democratic Party
|
|5.33%
|-
|style="background-color:#000000"|
|colspan=2 |against all
|
|9.11%
|-
| colspan="5" style="background-color:#E9E9E9;"|
|- style="font-weight:bold"
| colspan="3" style="text-align:left;" | Total
| 
| 100%
|-
| colspan="5" style="background-color:#E9E9E9;"|
|- style="font-weight:bold"
| colspan="4" |Source:
|
|}

1999

|-
! colspan=2 style="background-color:#E9E9E9;text-align:left;vertical-align:top;" |Candidate
! style="background-color:#E9E9E9;text-align:left;vertical-align:top;" |Party
! style="background-color:#E9E9E9;text-align:right;" |Votes
! style="background-color:#E9E9E9;text-align:right;" |%
|-
|style="background-color:#3B9EDF"|
|align=left|Flyura Ziyatdinova
|align=left|Fatherland – All Russia
|
|49.78%
|-
|style="background-color:"|
|align=left|Nikolay Maksimov
|align=left|Communist Party
|
|13.70%
|-
|style="background-color:#004BBC"|
|align=left|Yury Petrov
|align=left|Russian Cause
|
|7.67%
|-
|style="background-color:"|
|align=left|Dania Karimova
|align=left|Independent
|
|6.12%
|-
|style="background-color:"|
|align=left|Georgy Gilmutdinov
|align=left|Independent
|
|6.02%
|-
|style="background-color:"|
|align=left|Rinat Mukhamadiev
|align=left|Russian All-People's Union
|
|4.15%
|-
|style="background-color:"|
|align=left|Valery Makhmutov
|align=left|Independent
|
|0.97%
|-
|style="background-color:#000000"|
|colspan=2 |against all
|
|7.93%
|-
| colspan="5" style="background-color:#E9E9E9;"|
|- style="font-weight:bold"
| colspan="3" style="text-align:left;" | Total
| 
| 100%
|-
| colspan="5" style="background-color:#E9E9E9;"|
|- style="font-weight:bold"
| colspan="4" |Source:
|
|}

2003

|-
! colspan=2 style="background-color:#E9E9E9;text-align:left;vertical-align:top;" |Candidate
! style="background-color:#E9E9E9;text-align:left;vertical-align:top;" |Party
! style="background-color:#E9E9E9;text-align:right;" |Votes
! style="background-color:#E9E9E9;text-align:right;" |%
|-
|style="background-color:"|
|align=left|Albert Salikhov
|align=left|United Russia
|
|68.80%
|-
|style="background-color:"|
|align=left|Robert Sadykov
|align=left|Communist Party
|
|8.85%
|-
|style="background-color:"|
|align=left|Aleksandr Yakushev
|align=left|Independent
|
|5.32%
|-
|style="background:#7C73CC"| 
|align=left|Yury Petrov
|align=left|Great Russia–Eurasian Union
|
|4.18%
|-
|style="background:#1042A5"| 
|align=left|Shamil Smirnov
|align=left|Union of Right Forces
|
|2.12%
|-
|style="background-color:#000000"|
|colspan=2 |against all
|
|7.74%
|-
| colspan="5" style="background-color:#E9E9E9;"|
|- style="font-weight:bold"
| colspan="3" style="text-align:left;" | Total
| 
| 100%
|-
| colspan="5" style="background-color:#E9E9E9;"|
|- style="font-weight:bold"
| colspan="4" |Source:
|
|}

2016

|-
! colspan=2 style="background-color:#E9E9E9;text-align:left;vertical-align:top;" |Candidate
! style="background-color:#E9E9E9;text-align:leftt;vertical-align:top;" |Party
! style="background-color:#E9E9E9;text-align:right;" |Votes
! style="background-color:#E9E9E9;text-align:right;" |%
|-
| style="background-color: " |
|align=left|Ayrat Khayrullin
|align=left|United Russia
|
|86.19%
|-
|style="background-color:"|
|align=left|Albert Yagudin
|align=left|Communist Party
|
|4.73%
|-
|style="background-color:"|
|align=left|Dmitry Vildanov
|align=left|A Just Russia
|
|3.12%
|-
|style="background-color:"|
|align=left|Anna Artemyeva
|align=left|Liberal Democratic Party
|
|1.96%
|-
|style="background:"| 
|align=left|Yevgeny Iosipov
|align=left|Communists of Russia
|
|1.27%
|-
|style="background-color:"|
|align=left|Rinat Zakirov
|align=left|Independent
|
|1.17%
|-
|style="background-color:"|
|align=left|Andrey Lukin
|align=left|People's Freedom Party
|
|1.13%
|-
| colspan="5" style="background-color:#E9E9E9;"|
|- style="font-weight:bold"
| colspan="3" style="text-align:left;" | Total
| 
| 100%
|-
| colspan="5" style="background-color:#E9E9E9;"|
|- style="font-weight:bold"
| colspan="4" |Source:
|
|}

2020

|-
! colspan=2 style="background-color:#E9E9E9;text-align:left;vertical-align:top;" |Candidate
! style="background-color:#E9E9E9;text-align:left;vertical-align:top;" |Party
! style="background-color:#E9E9E9;text-align:right;" |Votes
! style="background-color:#E9E9E9;text-align:right;" |%
|-
|style="background-color: " |
|align=left|Oleg Morozov
|align=left|United Russia
|279,450
|73.42%
|-
|style="background-color: " |
|align=left|Albert Yagudin
|align=left|Communist Party
|35,536
|9.34%
|-
|style="background-color: " |
|align=left|Ilnar Siraev
|align=left|A Just Russia
|26,001
|6.83%
|-
|style="background-color: " |
|align=left|Nikolay Barsukov
|align=left|Communists of Russia
|14,351
|3.77%
|-
|style="background-color: " |
|align=left|Andrey Kolosov
|align=left|Liberal Democratic Party
|14,149
|3.72%
|-
|style="background-color: #ff2e2e" |
|align=left|Leonid Strazhnikov
|align=left|Communist Party of Social Justice
|8,736
|2.30%
|-
| colspan="5" style="background-color:#E9E9E9;"|
|- style="font-weight:bold"
| colspan="3" style="text-align:left;" | Total
| 380,616
| 100%
|-
| colspan="5" style="background-color:#E9E9E9;"|
|- style="font-weight:bold"
| colspan="4" |Source:
|
|}

2021

|-
! colspan=2 style="background-color:#E9E9E9;text-align:left;vertical-align:top;" |Candidate
! style="background-color:#E9E9E9;text-align:left;vertical-align:top;" |Party
! style="background-color:#E9E9E9;text-align:right;" |Votes
! style="background-color:#E9E9E9;text-align:right;" |%
|-
|style="background-color: " |
|align=left|Oleg Morozov (incumbent)
|align=left|United Russia
|
|72.45%
|-
|style="background-color:"|
|align=left|Dinar Ayupov
|align=left|Communist Party
|
|6.62%
|-
|style="background-color:"|
|align=left|Ilnar Siraev
|align=left|A Just Russia — For Truth
|
|5.66%
|-
|style="background-color:"|
|align=left|Valery Aleynikov
|align=left|Liberal Democratic Party
|
|3.72%
|-
|style="background-color: "|
|align=left|Vitaly Smirnov
|align=left|Party of Pensioners
|
|2.99%
|-
|style="background-color: " |
|align=left|Andrey Geyko
|align=left|Yabloko
|
|2.63%
|-
|style="background-color: " |
|align=left|Roman Fedotov
|align=left|Party of Growth
|
|2.46%
|-
|style="background-color: " |
|align=left|Renat Khodzhaev
|align=left|New People
|
|2.42%
|-
| colspan="5" style="background-color:#E9E9E9;"|
|- style="font-weight:bold"
| colspan="3" style="text-align:left;" | Total
| 
| 100%
|-
| colspan="5" style="background-color:#E9E9E9;"|
|- style="font-weight:bold"
| colspan="4" |Source:
|
|}

Notes

References

Russian legislative constituencies
Politics of Tatarstan